Nick Cheung Ka-fai (born 2 December 1964) is a Hong Kong actor, singer and director.

Background
He was formerly a Royal Hong Kong Police officer for four years, but he left the job after his request to be transferred to the criminal investigation department was turned down. He then worked for Danny Lee's film production company. His film debut is "Thank you, Sir!", as a student at the Royal Hong Kong Cadet School. From 1989 to 1994, he worked at the television station ATV World. Later, he left ATV and joined another station, TVB. He left TVB in 2004, and worked mainly on films. His fame was built on Wong Jing's comedy at first, but he has changed his acting style for more sombre roles since 2003. He was nominated for his first Hong Kong film award in 1999, and won his first award in 2009 for his role in Beast Stalker. He has been nominated many times at the Hong Kong Film Awards and other Chinese film awards since.

Cheung has won seven awards for his role in Beast Stalker (2008), including Hong Kong Film Critics Society Award for Best Actor, Hong Kong Film Award for Best Actor, and Golden Horse Film Award for Best Actor.

In 2013, he also won praise and Best Actor awards for his role as an aging MMA fighter in Unbeatable.

Cheung met Hong Kong actress Esther Kwan while he was still working at ATV. They married on 8 December 2003 in Australia. Their daughter, Brittany Cheung (張童; Cheung Tung), was born on 24 January 2006.

Cheung earned 75 million HKD in 2014.

Filmography

Film

Television

Dubbing roles

Cheung has also provided Cantonese voice dubs for foreign films and television programmes.

References

External links
 
 
 Nick Cheung on LoveHKFilm.com
 Nick Cheung at the Hong Kong Cinemagic

 

1964 births
Living people
People from Panyu District
TVB veteran actors
Hong Kong male film actors
Hong Kong male television actors
Hong Kong male comedians
Hong Kong film directors
Hong Kong male singers
20th-century Hong Kong male actors
21st-century Hong Kong male actors
Hong Kong police officers
Hong Kong martial artists